Jalpaiguri Sadar subdivision is an administrative division of the Jalpaiguri district in the Indian state of West Bengal.

Geography

Subdivisions
Jalpaiguri district is divided into the following administrative subdivisions:

Administrative units
Jalpaiguri Sadar subdivision has 6 police stations, 4 community development blocks, 4 panchayat samitis, 58 gram panchayats, 247 mouzas, 231 inhabited villages, 2 municipalities, part of 1 municipal corporation and 9 census towns. The municipalities are: Jalpaiguri and Dhupguri. The municipal corporation partly in the subdivision is Siliguri. The census towns are: Dabgram, Binnaguri, Chakiabhita, Kharia, Mainaguri, Dakshin Khagrabari, Banarhat, Telipara Tea Garden  and Gairkata. The subdivision has its headquarters at Jalpaiguri.

Police stations
Police stations in the Jalpatguri Sadar subdivision have the following features and jurisdiction:

Blocks
Community development blocks in the Jalpaiguri Sadar subdivision are:

Gram Panchayats
The subdivision contains 58 gram panchayats under 5 community development blocks:

 Jalpaiguri block consists of 14 gram panchayats, viz. Arabinda, Boalmari–Nandanpur, Kharija–Barubari–I, Paharpur, Bahadur, South Berubari, Kharija–Berubari–II, Patkata, Baropatia Nutanabos, Garalbari, Mondalghat, Belakoba, Kharia and Nagar Berubari.

 Maynaguri block consists of 16 gram panchayats, viz. Amguri, Domohoni–I, Madhabdanga–I, Padamoti–II, Barnish, Domohoni–II, Madhabdanga–II, Ramshai, Churabhandar, Khagrabari–I, Maynaguri, Saptibari–I, Dharmapur, Khagrabari–II, Padamoti–I and Saptibari–II.

 Dhupguri block consists of 9 gram panchayats, viz. Jharaltagram–I, Sakoyajhora–II, Salbari–II, Barogharia, Gadhearkuthi, Magurmari–I, Godong–I, Magurmari–II, Godong–II.

 Rajganj block consists of 12 gram panchayats, viz. Binnaguri, Fulbari–I, Majhiali, Sannyasikata, Dabgram–I, Fulbari–II, Mantadari, Sikarpur, Dabgram–II, Kukurjan, Panikauri and Sukhani.

 Banarhat (Community development block)|Banarhat]] block consists of 7 gram panchayats, viz. Banarhat–I, Banarhat–II, Chamurchi, Binnaguri, Salbari–I, Sakoyajhora–I, Jharaltagram–II.

Education
Given in the table below (data in numbers) is a comprehensive picture of the education scenario in Jalpaguri district, with data for the year 2013-14.

Note: Primary schools include junior basic schools; middle schools, high schools and higher secondary schools include madrasahs; technical schools include junior technical schools, junior government polytechnics, industrial technical institutes, industrial training centres, nursing training institutes etc.; technical and professional colleges include engineering colleges, medical colleges, para-medical institutes, management colleges, teachers training and nursing training colleges, law colleges, art colleges, music colleges etc. Special and non-formal education centres include sishu siksha kendras, madhyamik siksha kendras, centres of Rabindra mukta vidyalaya, recognised Sanskrit tols, institutions for the blind and other handicapped persons, Anganwadi centres, reformatory schools etc.

Educational institutions
The following institutions are located in Jalpaiguri Sadar subdivision:
Ananda Chandra College was established at Jalpaiguri in 1942. Affiliated with the University of North Bengal, it offers honours courses in arts and science, a post-grauduate course in Bengali and an under-graduate course in physical education.
Ananda Chandra College of Commerce was established at Jalpaiguri in 1965. Affiliated with the University of North Bengal, it offers courses in commerce and some other subjects also.
Banarhat Kartik Oraon Hindi Government College was established at Banarhat in 2014. Affiliated with the University of North Bengal, it is a Hindi-medium institution offering courses in arts and science.
Dhupguri Girls’ College was established at Dhupguri in 2013. Affiliated with the University of North Bengal, it offers courses in arts.
Jalpaiguri Government Engineering College, is an autonomous institution established in 1961.
Jalpaiguri Law College was established in 1981. It offers a five year integrated course.
Kabi Sukanta Mahavidyalaya was established at Dhupguri in 1981.Affiliated with the University of North Bengal, it offers courses in arts and commerce.
Maynaguri College was established in 1999. Affiliated with the University of North Bengal, it offers courses it offers courses in arts and science.
North Bengal St. Xavier’s College, a Jesuit institution was established at Rajganj in 2007. Affiliated with the University of North Bengal it offers courses in arts, science and commerce.
Prasannadeb Women’s College was established at Jalpaiguri in 1950. Affiliated with the University of North Bengal, it offers courses in arts and science.
Rajganj College was established in 2009. Affiliated with the University of North Bengal, it offers courses in arts.

Healthcare
The table below (all data in numbers) presents an overview of the medical facilities available and patients treated in the hospitals, health centres and sub-centres in Jalpaiguri district, with data for the year 2014.: 

.* Excluding nursing homes.

Medical facilities
Medical facilities in Jalpaiguri Sadar subdivision are as follows:

Hospitals: (Name, location, beds) 
Jalpaiguri District Hospital, Jalpaiguri M, 610 beds
Rani Ashrumati Memorial T.B. Hospital, Jalpaiguri, 60 beds
Jalpaiguri Jail Hospital, Jalpaiguri, 30 beds
Jalpaiguri Police Hospital, Jalpaiguri, 28 beds
New Jalpaiguri Railway Hospital, Bhaktinagar, Rajganj CD block, 100 beds
Domohoni Railway Hospital, Domohoni, Maynaguri CD block, 2 beds

Rural Hospitals: (Name, CD block, location, beds) 
Maynaguri Rural Hospital, Maynaguri CD block, Mainaguri, 60 beds
Dhupguri Rural Hospital, Dhupguri CD block, Dhupguri, 30 beds
Rajganj Rural Hospital, Rajganj CD block, Payachari, 30 beds
Belacoba Rural Hospital, Jalpaiguri CD block, Prasannanagr, 30 beds

Primary Health Centres : (CD block-wise)(CD block, PHC location, beds)
Jalpaiguri CD block: Bahadur (4), Kharija Berubari (10), Nadanpur Bolamari (PO Bolamari) (4), Rangdhamali (10), South Berubari (PO Manikganj) (4). 
Maynaguri CD block: Barnes (10), Bhurangabari (PO Bakali) (10), Churabhandar (10), Singhimari (Domohoni) (6), Saptibari (10), Ramsi (PO Panbari) (6).
Dhupguri CD block: Jhar Altargram (PO Dankanmari) (4), Sakarjhora (PO Sajnapara) (4), Duramari (Salbari) (6).
Rajganj CD block: Kalinagar (10), Sikarpur (6), Kukrajn (Sukbari) (6).

References

Subdivisions of West Bengal
Subdivisions in Jalpaiguri district
Jalpaiguri district